Vadim Vladimirovich Karkachev  is a former Soviet ice dancer. With partner Natalia Annenko, he was the 1982 World Junior champion.

Competitive highlights 
(with Annenko)

References

External links 
 Figure Skating — Vadim Karkachev
 James R. Hines. Historical Dictionary of Figure Skating
 ISU World Junior Figure Skating Championships

Navigation

Soviet male ice dancers
 Living people
World Junior Figure Skating Championships medalists
1963 births
Sportspeople from Tula, Russia